The Kern government was the 29th Government of Austria, in office from 18 May 2016 to 18 December 2017. It was a grand coalition between the Social Democratic Party (SPÖ) and People's Party (ÖVP), in which Christian Kern held the position of chancellor and Reinhold Mitterlehner was vice-chancellor.

Succeeding the Second Faymann government, following the resignation of Chancellor Werner Faymann amidst the 2016 presidential election, it was succeeded by the First Kurz government following the 2017 legislative election. The cabinet was appointed by outgoing President Heinz Fischer.

Composition

External links 
 Federal Chancellery of Austria: Government

Politics of Austria
2016 establishments in Austria
Austrian governments
2010s in Austria